Netter–Ullman Building, also known as "Netter's temporary home of the Heer store", is a historic department store building located at Springfield, Greene County, Missouri, United States.

Description 
It was built in 1913, and is a three-story, rectangular red brick commercial building. It measures 107 feet wide by 127 feet deep. It features understated limestone insets and horizontal limestone belting.

Historic Place 
It was listed on the National Register of Historic Places in 2003. It is located in the Springfield Public Square Historic District.

References

Individually listed contributing properties to historic districts on the National Register in Missouri
Commercial buildings on the National Register of Historic Places in Missouri
Commercial buildings completed in 1913
Buildings and structures in Springfield, Missouri
National Register of Historic Places in Greene County, Missouri
1913 establishments in Missouri